Indios Verdes metro station is a station of the Mexico City Metro along Insurgentes Norte Avenue in the colonias (neighborhoods) of Residencial Zacatenco and Santa Isabel Tola, in Gustavo A. Madero, Mexico City. It is an at-grade station with two island platforms that serves as the northern terminus of Line 3 (the Olive Line). It is followed by Deportivo 18 de Marzo station. The station and its surrounding area are named this way because of the verdigris statues of Itzcoatl and Ahuitzotl, both Aztec rulers. They are located in Mestizaje Park and are collectively known as the Monumento a los Indios Verdes; the statues are featured in the pictogram. The station was opened on 1 December 1979, on the first day of service between Indios Verdes and Hospital General stations.

The station facilities are partially accessible for people with disabilities as there are tactile pavings and braille signage plates. In 2019, the station had an average daily ridership of 107,376 passengers, making it the 3rd busiest station in the system and the busiest of the line.

Location and station layout
Indios Verdes is a metro station along Insurgentes Norte Avenue, located in the colonia (Mexican Spanish for "neighborhoods") of Residencial Zacatenco and Santa Isabel Tola, in the Gustavo A. Madero borough, in northern Mexico City. Within the system, Deportivo 18 de Marzo is the next station. The station facilities are partially accessible for people with disabilities as there are tactile pavings and braille signage plates.

There are four exits, one to the northeast and northwest of the station and one to the southeast and southwest of it. From there, commuters can ride different routes and transport methods. The area is serviced by Lines 1, 3, and 7 of the Metrobús system; Line IV of the Mexibús system; Line 1 of the Cablebús network, and in the future, Line 2 of the Mexicable network. Local buses that leave the area include the Routes 101, 101-A, 101-B, 101-D, 102, 107-B, and 108 of the Red de Transporte de Pasajeros network.

In addition, by 2017, there were 28 transportation routes, locally known as peseros, that depart to other points in the city and the metropolitan area. The CETRAM is filled with street stalls where commuters can buy street food, clothing and accessories, flowers and gifts, and cellphone accessories. According to the vendors themselves, there are about 1,000 of them.

The line's workshop and the respective railyard are located next to the station. They are named Ticomán.

History and construction

Indios Verdes metro station opened on 1 December 1979, on the first day of the Indios Verdes–Hospital General service. The station is named after the verdigris statues of Itzcoatl and Ahuitzotl, collectively known as the Monumento a los Indios Verdes. The statues are also featured in the pictogram.

Originally, Line 8 (which runs from downtown Mexico City to Constitución de 1917 station in Iztapalapa) was planned to run from Pantitlán, in eastern Mexico City, to Indios Verdes station. The project was canceled due to potential structural issues it would have caused near the Zócalo zone as it was planned to interchange with Line 2 at Zócalo station. The project of Line 8 was later modified to run from Indios Verdes to Constitución de 1917 station. However, its construction did not go beyond Garibaldi / Lagunilla metro station, its provisional terminal since 1994.

In 2020, a restructuring of the CETRAM began. The project plans to demolish the Metrobús station serving lines 1 and 3 and the temporary Mexibús station and place them next to the metro station. It is also intended to reorganize the bus hub and facilitate the connection of the stations with a series of pedestrian bridges that will connect these three stations to the Cablebús, Metrobús Line 7, and Mexicable services.

Incidents
On 12 April 2013, around 7:30 in the morning, an explosion was registered on the stairs that connect to CETRAM's I platform. There were no injuries or material damage. According to authorities, a man who was assisted by an accomplice who served as a lookout (both unidentified) left a box containing gunpowder, wires, pellets, a battery and a watch on the stairs leading to exit I. On 10 February 2021, an inbound train caught fire on the platform during a rainy afternoon. Passengers were unharmed. On 20 April 2021, the third railcar of a train derailed when the driver performed a maneuver at the Ticomán railyard. No injuries were reported but the train had to be taken out of service. Indios Verdes metro station is among the most frequently flooded stations during heavy rains.

Ridership
According to the data provided by the authorities since the 2000s, Indios Verdes station has been one of the busiest stations of the system's 195 stations. In the last decade, commuters averaged between 64,200 and 124,600 daily entrances. In 2019, before the impact of the COVID-19 pandemic on public transport, the station's ridership totaled 39,192,273 passengers, which represented a decrease of 1,109,896 passengers compared to 2018. In the same year, Indios Verdes metro station was the 3rd busiest of the system's 195 stations and it was the busiest of the line.

Gallery

Notes

References

External links

1979 establishments in Mexico
Accessible Mexico City Metro stations
Mexico City Metro Line 3 stations
Mexico City Metro stations in Gustavo A. Madero, Mexico City
Railway stations opened in 1979